Point Danger or Danger Point may refer:

Places
Australia
 Point Danger (Tweed Heads), on the border of New South Wales and Queensland
 Point Danger (Portland), south-western Victoria
 Point Danger (Torquay), south-western Victoria

Other places
 Danger Point (County Devon), England, UK

Facilities and structures
 Danger Point Lighthouse, Walker Bay, South Africa
 Point Danger Light, located at Point Danger (Tweed Heads) on the border of New South Wales and Queensland, Australia

See also
 Danger (disambiguation)
 Point (disambiguation)